116th meridian may refer to:

116th meridian east, a line of longitude east of the Greenwich Meridian
116th meridian west, a line of longitude west of the Greenwich Meridian